Tapanuli (or, in obsolete Dutch spelling, Tapanoeli) may refer to:
 Central Tapanuli Regency, North Sumatra, Indonesia
 North Tapanuli Regency, North Sumatra, Indonesia
 South Tapanuli Regency, North Sumatra, Indonesia
 Tapanuli orangutan, a species of orangutan
 Tapanoeli Residency, a colonial Dutch administrative division consisting of most of the western coast of modern North Sumatra province. 
 Sibolga Bay, formerly called in Dutch Baai van Tapanoeli, North Sumatra
 SS Tapanoeli, a Dutch steam merchant ship from Rotterdam that was active from 1924, primarily in connection to Batavia, Dutch East Indies, which was sunk by German U-boats on 17 March 1941
 A World War II military command associated with its peer command of Sumatra
 Tapanuli fever, a fictional illness from the Sherlock Holmes story The Adventure of the Dying Detective